Streptomyces azureus is a bacterium species from the genus of Streptomyces which has isolated from soil. Streptomyces azureus produces the antibiotic thiostrepton.

See also 
 List of Streptomyces species

References

Further reading

External links
Type strain of Streptomyces azureus at BacDive -  the Bacterial Diversity Metadatabase

azureus
Bacteria described in 1959